Robert John Westlake ( – November 14, 1993) was a Canadian football player who played for the Hamilton Wildcats, Toronto Argonauts, Calgary Stampeders and Montreal Alouettes. He won the Grey Cup with the Argonauts in 1950. He played football previously for the University of Toronto and Delta High School in his hometown of Hamilton, Ontario. He died in Edmonton in 1993.

References

1920s births
1993 deaths
Toronto Argonauts players